The United States competed at the 2019 Winter Deaflympics which was held in Valtellina and Valchiavenna, Italy, from December 12 to 21, 2019. The United States was one of the 34 nations to compete at the multi-sport event. This was the nation's 12th appearance at the Winter Deaflympics, having regularly participated at the event since making its debut in 1967. 42 athletes represented the United States at the Deaflympics in all six sporting events including chess, cross-country skiing, curling, ice hockey, alpine skiing, and snowboarding.

Medalists

Participants 

source

Alpine skiing

Chess

Cross-country skiing

Curling

Ice hockey 

In July 2019, the American men's deaf ice hockey team announced a squad consisting of 23 players for the event. The men's team will be captained by Peter Gintoli while his younger brother Garrett Gintoli will serve as his deputy. The women's team was not eligible to compete at the event as the women's ice hockey event was discontinued by the organizers and by the International Committee of Sports for the Deaf due to the low number of participants. The men's team defeated Canada 7–3 in the final to secure its first gold medal ever in Winter Deaflympics.

Snowboarding 

In total snowboarders representing the United States won two gold medals, one silver medal and two bronze medals and the country finished in 2nd place in the snowboarding medal table.

References 

Winter Deaflympics
Nations at the 2019 Winter Deaflympics